Xavi is a Spanish given name, usually used as a nickname for Xavier. Notable people with the name include:

Football 

 Xavi (born 1980), Spanish footballer
 Xavi Andorrà (born 1985), Andorran footballer
 Xavi Annunziata (born 1987), Spanish footballer
 Xavi Molina (born 1986), Spanish footballer
 Xavi Moro (born 1975), Spanish footballer
 Xavi Simons (born 2003), Dutch footballer
 Xavi Torres (born 1986), Spanish footballer
 Xavi Valero (born 1973), Spanish footballer
 Xavi (Portuguese footballer) (born 1983), Portuguese footballer

Other 

 Xavi Rey (born 1987), Spanish basketball player
 Xavi Lleonart, Spanish field hockey player
 Xavi Rabaseda (born 1989), Spanish basketball player
 Xavi Vallmajó (born 1975), Spanish basketball player
 Xavi Vierge (born 30 April 1997), Spanish motorcycle racer

See also 
 Xavier (disambiguation)

Spanish masculine given names
Spanish-language hypocorisms